The Crossing is a 1990 Australian romantic drama film directed by George Ogilvie, produced by Sue Seeary and written by Ranald Allan. The film stars Russell Crowe, Robert Mammone and Danielle Spencer. The film was shot in the towns of Junee and Condobolin in New South Wales, Australia. The film was released in Australia on 18 October 1990.
Russell Crowe was nominated for the Australian Film Institute Award for best actor while Jeff Darling was awarded for the best cinematography.

Plot
The film is set in a small country town in the 1960s. Sam returns home from being away for 18 months to discover his former girlfriend, Meg, has moved on with their common friend, Johnny.

Cast
 Russell Crowe as Johnny
 Robert Mammone as Sam
 Danielle Spencer as Meg
 Emily Lumbers as Jenny
 Rodney Bell as Shortly
 Ben Oxenbould as Heavyfoot
 Myles Collins as Stretch
 Marc Gray as Nort
 Megan Connolly as Kathleen
 John Blair as Billy
 Rani Lockland as Gail
 Lea-Ann Towler as Mandy
 Paul Robertson as Birdie
 George Whaley as Sid
 Jacquy Phillips as Marion

Music

 Martin Armiger – soundtrack composer
 Derek Williams – orchestrator, conductor

Soundtrack
An album produced by Martin Armiger was released in 1990 in Australia and Europe. King of the Road was released as the first single, and made the top ten in UK and Germany. A video for Nature Boy performed by Kate Ceberano was also created to promote the album.

 "Main Titles" by Martin Armiger 
 "King of the Road" by The Proclaimers
 "Nature Boy" by Kate Ceberano
 "She's Not There" by Crowded House
 "For Your Love" by Peter Blakeley
 "Betty Wrong" by Tin Machine
 "The Chase" by Martin Armiger
 "Here Comes That Feeling" by The Cockroaches
 "My Boyfriend's Back" by The Chantoozies
 "Love Letters" by Stephen Cummings
 "Nowhere To Run" by Jenn Forbes
 "Let's Dance" by The Cockroaches
 "Love Theme" by Martin Armiger

Production
Ranald Allan's script had been around for a number of years before being picked up by producer Sue Seeary, who managed to get the film up at Beyond International Group. It was their first feature film. Beyond's head of production, Al Clark did commission some re-writing. Production took place in and around Junee in November and December 1989.

Box office
The Crossing grossed A$87,392 at the box office in Australia.

See also
 Cinema of Australia
 Russell Crowe filmography

References

External links
 
The Crossing at Oz Movies

1990 films
1990 independent films
1990 romantic drama films
1990s chase films
1990s coming-of-age drama films
Australian coming-of-age drama films
Australian romantic drama films
Australian independent films
Coming-of-age romance films
Films set in 1965
Films set in New South Wales
Films set in the 1960s
1990s English-language films